Afrin is a city in northern Syria. In the Afrin District, it is part of the Aleppo Governorate. The total population of the district  was recorded at 172,095 people, of whom 36,562 lived in the town of Afrin itself.

The town and district are named after the Afrin River. The city is split into two distinct halves by the river. As a result of Operation Olive Branch, the People's Protection Units withdrew after the city's encirclement from Afrin on 17 March 2018, and the Syrian National Army and Turkish Armed Forces captured Afrin the next day, bringing it under the Turkish occupation of northern Syria. While thousands fled as the SDF retreated, an estimated 50,000 to 70,000 people remained in Afrin city after the Turkish and Syrian National Army capture.

After the Syrian National Army took control over the city, more than half of the Kurdish population fled the city. The remaining Kurds have faced harassment by local militant groups, including extortion, detention and kidnapping. Kurds have also experienced seizure and destruction of their land and Kurdish farmers have been discriminated in comparison their Arab neighbors. The Kurdish language has also been restrained.

History

About 8 km south of the town of Afrin, there are the remains of a Neo-Hittite (Iron Age) settlement known as Tell Ain Dara. In a field northwest of the city, a 9th or 8th century BC Luwian stele (named the Afrin stele) was discovered; it is a fragment of a full stele as only the middle section survives, which in turn is damaged with the right side totally destroyed taking with it parts of the right edge of the front and left edge of the back. The stele's front shows a part of a relief; a short fringed kilt usually worn by the Hittite storm god is shown indicating that the stele was a storm god one.

Cyrrhus overlooking the Afrin River once served as a military base for the Romans conducting campaigns against the Armenian Empire to the north. By the 4th Century it had become an important centre for Christianity with its own bishop.

The Afrin valley was part of Roman Syria until the Muslim conquest of the Levant in 637. The Afrin river was known as Oinoparas (in Greek Οινοπάρας) in the Seleucid era, in the Roman era the name became Ufrenus, whence the Arab vernacular ʿAfrīn, ʿIfrīn, adopted as Kurdish Efrîn.

The area was briefly conquered by the Principality of Antioch, but again came under Muslim rule in 1260 following the Mongol invasions. In the Ottoman period, the area was part of the Kilis Province.

Although it is not contiguous with the main area of Kurdish settlement, the Afrin valley saw Kurdish settlement by 16th-17th centuries.

In 18th century, Afrin was referred to as the Sancak of the Kurds in Ottoman documents.

Modern era
With the drawing of the Syria–Turkey border in 1923, Afrin became detached from Kilis Province and was part of French-administrated Syria (i.e. the State of Aleppo, State of Syria (1924–30), Syrian Republic (1930–58)) and was eventually incorporated in modern Syria at the state's formation in 1961.

The town of Afrin was founded as a market in the 19th century. In 1929, the number of permanent residents was 800, growing to 7,000 by 1968. The town was developed by France under the French mandate of Syria. The main square is Afrin bus station, and the old settlement area stretches northward on the slope of a hill, but more recently habitations have spread to the other side of the river and extend as far to the south-east as the neighboring village of Turandah.

Since the Turkish annexation of Hatay Province in 1939, the Afrin District is now almost surrounded by the Syria–Turkey border, apart from the border with the Azaz District to the east and a short border with the Mount Simeon District to the southeast.

There was an outbreak of civil unrest on 16 March 2004, during which three people were killed by Syrian police. In 1999, the arrest of Kurdish leader Abdullah Öcalan triggered renewed clashes between Kurdish protesters and the police.

Syrian Civil War

During the Syrian Civil War, Syrian government forces withdrew from the city in the summer of 2012. The Popular Protection Units (YPG) took control of the city soon afterward.

Afrin Canton as a de facto autonomous part was declared on 29 January 2014, the town of Afrin being the administrative center. The assembly elected Hêvî Îbrahîm Mustefa prime minister, who later appointed Remzi Şêxmus and Ebdil Hemid Mistefa to work as deputies.

Between 2012 and 2018, the YPG, the official defence force of the canton, was criticized for recruiting child soldiers, committing arbitrary arrests and failing to address unsolved killings and disappearances. According to the reports, the YPG and Asayish were also accused of forcibly recruiting civilians, arresting political activists and displacing Arabs whose homes were later stolen and looted. Displaced Arabs accused the Kurdish security forces of imposing taxes and restrictions on the population in order to force them to leave and change the demography.

Turkish military incursion 

On 20 January 2018, the Turkish army began the Operation Olive Branch alleging that the Government ruling in Afrin were terrorists. On the same day, the Turkish Air Force bombed more than 100 targets in Afrin. On 28 January 2018 Syria's antiquities department and the British-based Syrian Observatory for Human Rights said that Turkish shelling had seriously damaged the ancient temple of Ain Dara at Afrin. Syria called for international pressure on Turkey "to prevent the targeting of archaeological and cultural sites". On 20 February 2018, a Syrian army convoy consisting of 50 vehicles had arrived in Afrin through the Ziyarat border crossing and were deployed to different areas. Five vehicles reached the center of the city of Afrin.

On 14 March 2018, Redur Xelil, the senior official of the Syrian Democratic Forces accused Turkey of settling Arab and Turkmen families in the villages captured by Turkish army. A senior Turkish official denied the accusations.

On 18 March 2018, on the 58th day of Operation Olive Branch, the Syrian National Army and the Turkish Armed Forces captured Afrin from the YPG and the YPJ. Shortly after its capture, SNA fighters looted parts of the city and destroyed numerous Kurdish symbols, including a statue of Kāve, as Turkish Army troops solidified control by raising Turkish flags and banners over the city. In areas which were captured by the Olive Branch forces, the Turkish Red Crescent (TRC) has provided population with help which covered the basic needs between 15 February and 15 March 2018.

After the capture of Afrin by the Turkish led forces, the city came under the control of the Government of Turkey, which provides the administration and delivers education and security to the region.

On 12 April 2018, a Turkish-backed interim council was elected in Afrin, consisting of 20 "elders from the city" – 11 Kurds, eight Arabs, and one Turkmen, Turkish state media reported. The council is headed by a Kurd named Zuhair Haider who, in an interview with the state-run Anadolu Agency, expressed his gratitude to Turkey and vowed to "serve" the local citizens.

In June 2018, the United Nations published a report stating that the security situation under Turkish-backed rebel control remains volatile. The OHCHR had received reports of lawlessness and rampant criminality, such as theft, harassment, cruel treatment and other abuse, and murders committed by several Turkish-backed armed groups, especially by the Sultan Murad and Hamza Divisions. The OCHR stated that civilians, particularly ethnic Kurds from Afrin, are being targeted for discrimination by the same Turkish-backed fighters.

On 2 August 2018, Amnesty International reported that the Turkish forces were giving Syrian armed groups free rein to commit serious human rights abuses against civilians in the northern city of Afrin. The research had found the Turkish-backed fighters have involved in arbitrary detentions, torture, forced displacement, enforced disappearances, confiscation of property, and looting.

On 28 April 2020, a bombing in Afrin killed 40 people, including 11 children. No group claimed responsibility. Turkey blamed the YPG for the attack.

On 11 October 2021, a car bombing killed at least 6 people.

Hayat Tahrir al-Sham entered the city on 13 October 2022, during clashes between SNA groups in the region.

Health care 
The World Health Organization reported that Afrin counted with four hospitals before March 2018. Starting April 2018, Physical condition in hospitals and health centers has been improved. Hospital health centers in Afrin district center were put into service. In addition, mobile health screening vehicles, which include a team of doctors and nurses, started to provide health services by visiting all towns and villages at certain intervals since the beginning of April 2018. According to the data obtained from the Hatay Governorship, 17 thousand 236 people were examined and 2 thousand 288 people were vaccinated in the health units that started operations in early April and where 68 Turkish personnel were employed. 42 children were born in Afrin State Hospital, where 4 new dialysis devices serve.

Education
In August 2015, the University of Afrin started teaching, with initial programs in literature, engineering and economics, including institutes for medicine, topographic engineering, music and theater, business administration and the Kurdish language. In January 2018, the university closed due to Operation Olive Branch and did not open after the city was captured by Turkish-backed forces. In October 2019, Turkey announced that the University of Gaziantep will open a Faculty of Education in Afrin. In February 2019, it was reported that Turkey was assuming control over the educational matters in Afrin, providing training to teachers and turkifiying the curriculum taught in the schools. BBC also reported that Turkey enabled the establishment of a religious İmam Hatip school in Afrin.

Economy
The olive tree is the symbol of Afrin. Afrin is a production center for olives. Since the Turkish army captured Afrin, the olives have been confiscated by the Turkish backed forces and exported to Turkey. Olive oil pressing and textiles are some of the city's local industries. Since the Turkish capture of Afrin, only companies registered in Turkey are permitted to do business in the city. On 9 November 2018, Turkey's trade minister Ruhsar Pekcan announced the opening of a border gate with Afrin dubbed "Olive Branch" - after the operational name of the Turkish offensive that captured the city months before.

Infrastructure 
In late 2018 a delegation from the Turkish Ministry of Energy and Natural Resources inspected the situation in Afrin and instructed a renovation of the electricity infrastructure.  On 13 January 2019, body filling, water intake structure, reinforced concrete and mechanical cover systems were completed and repaired by the Turkish State Hydraulic Works (DSI), for Afrin Dam. In this way, the water requirement of the city is re-established.

Climate

Afrin has a hot-summer Mediterranean climate with hot dry summers and cool winters with moderate rain and occasional snow.
The average high temperature in January is 9 °C and the average high temperature in July is 34 °C. The snow falls usually in January, February or December. Afrin's yearly rainfall ranges between 500 and 600 mm and the average rate of humidity is 61%. Afrin is surrounded by olive trees.

Notable people
Ebdo Mihemed, singer
Xelîl Xemgîn, singer
Îlham Ehmed, politician
Hêvî Îbrahîm, politician
Arin Mirkan, combatant

See also 
 Yazidis in Syria
 Operation Olive Branch

References

External links

A photo of the Afrin stele

 
Cities in Syria
Populated places in Afrin District
Kurdish communities in Syria